Jacques-Désiré Périatambée (born 15 October 1975) is a Mauritian former professional footballer who played as a midfielder. He represented Mauritius internationally with the Mauritius national team.

His previous clubs include AJ Auxerre, Troyes AC, Grenoble Foot 38, Le Mans UC 72, Chamois Niortais, Dijon FCO, SC Bastia all in the French football league system.

With Bastia Periatambee won the French third-tier in the 2010–11 season and the Ligue 2 in the 2011–12 season before retiring from professional football.

References

External links

1975 births
Living people
People from Plaines Wilhems District
Association football midfielders
Mauritian footballers
Mauritius international footballers
Mauritian expatriate footballers
AJ Auxerre players
ES Troyes AC players
Grenoble Foot 38 players
Le Mans FC players
Chamois Niortais F.C. players
Dijon FCO players
SC Bastia players
Ligue 1 players
Expatriate footballers in France
Mauritian expatriate sportspeople in France